The 2015–16 Elon Phoenix men's basketball team represented Elon University during the 2015–16 NCAA Division I men's basketball season. The Phoenix, led by seventh year head coach Matt Matheny, played their home games at Alumni Gym and were second year members of the Colonial Athletic Association. They finished the season 16–16, 7–11 in CAA play to finish in eighth place. They lost in the first round of the CAA tournament to Drexel.

Previous season
The Phoenix finished the season 15–18, 6–12 in CAA play to finish in eighth place. They lost in the quarterfinals of the CAA tournament to William & Mary.

Departures

Recruiting

Roster

Schedule

|-
!colspan=9 style="background:#910028; color:#CDB87D;"| Exhibition

|-
!colspan=9 style="background:#910028; color:#CDB87D;"| Non-conference regular season

|-
!colspan=9 style="background:#910028; color:#CDB87D;"| CAA regular season

|-
!colspan=9 style="background:#910028; color:#CDB87D;"| CAA tournament
|-

See also
2015–16 Elon Phoenix women's basketball team

References

Elon Phoenix men's basketball seasons
Elon